Blagojević (Cyrillic: Благојевић) ), also anglicized as Blagojevich or Blagoyevich, is a Montenegrin and Serbian surname, derived from the male given name (patronymic) of Blagoje. It may refer to:

Blagojevic / Blagojević
 Dragiša Blagojević (born 1966), Montenegrin chess grandmaster
 Cvijetin Blagojević (born 1955), Bosnian Serb football manager and former player
 Jelena Blagojević (born 1988), Serbian volleyball player
 Jovan Blagojevic (disambiguation), multiple people
 Katarina Blagojević, (born 1943), Serbian chess master
 Ljiljana Blagojević (born 1955), Serbian actress
 Milan Blagojevic (disambiguation), multiple people
 Milan Blagojevic (footballer), Australian football player
 Milan Blagojević (basketball), Serbian basketball player
 Milan Blagojević Španac, (1905–1941), Yugoslav military officer
 , Serbian jurist
 Miloš Blagojević (1930–2013), Serbian historian
 Saša Blagojević (b. 1989), Serbian footballer
 Slavko Blagojević (b. 1987), Croatian footballer
 Vera Blagojević (1920-1942), Yugoslav protester
 Vidoje Blagojević (born 1950) — Republika Srpska Army commander and Bosnian Serb war criminal 
 Željko Blagojević, Bosnian Serb runner and protester

Blagojevich
 Patricia Blagojevich (born 1965), née Mell, former First Lady of Illinois and wife of Rod Blagojevich
 Petar Blagojevich (died 1725), also spelled as Peter Plogojowitz — Serbian peasant suspected of becoming a vampire after his death
 Rod Blagojevich (born 1956), American politician, former Governor of Illinois

See also
 Blagoev, Bulgarian equivalent

Serbian surnames
Montenegrin surnames